Sorry I'm Late is the second studio album by English recording artist Cher Lloyd. It was released on 27 May 2014, by Epic Records, Syco Music, and Mr. Kanani. Lloyd herself co-wrote five songs on the album, working with new producers and songwriters such as Beth Ditto and Tove Lo. It is her last album released through Epic and Syco. Primarily a pop record, Sorry I'm Late also contains influences of dancehall and hip-hop.

Sorry I'm Late received generally positive reviews during its US release, with many critics praising Lloyd's personality and vulnerability on the album, and commenting on the maturity in comparison to her debut studio album, Sticks and Stones (2011). The album was preceded by the singles "I Wish" and "Sirens", both of which received equally positive reviews. The album was described as "fun" and "sweet but sharp" by critics. To promote the album, Lloyd embarked on her second headlining concert tour I Wish Tour, and her first by touring North America.

Background
On 16 October 2013, Lloyd told Billboard that the title of her second studio album is Sorry I'm Late. She explained, "I think it has two meanings. [...] It's been a long time since I've actually done anything new, but for me, it's as a person. I mean, I've spent a whole lot of time trying to figure out who I am, and I think everybody goes through that."

In November 2013, during an interview with Larry King, Lloyd confirmed that she had left Syco Music after she and Cowell disagreed about her career path in music. Lloyd also confirmed that Sorry I'm Late, which was originally due for release in November, was pushed back until early 2014, despite the record being done. She remarked, "My album got pushed back and I'm not happy about it. It's all done, but I am currently in the studio for the rest of this week to try and find some more magic. [...] It was meant to be coming out in November. Now I think it's going to be early next year."

The explicit version of the album artwork depicts Lloyd smoking while sitting in a bathtub; censored pressings of the record remove the smoke. On 20 May 2014, one week before the release, Lloyd made the album available for online stream on MTV.com. For the album, Lloyd worked with Beth Ditto and Tove Lo. In a July 2014 interview with Digital Spy, Lloyd spoke on being told by L.A. Reid to go back into the studio and create more "magic". She stated, "I think that sometimes the industry can panic and you have to be ready to take a risk, you know. If you're not taking a risk then what you have is boring. You do need to go in and find your magic. I've taken many risks on this album and I didn't need to find any more magic, the album was done, ready and it's a bit of a pain in the arse that it got delayed. It's only my fans that suffer, and they have to wait longer for it. So it should have been brought out earlier."

Promotion

Tour
Lloyd confirmed that she would be playing 34 shows across North America on the I Wish Tour as part of the album's promotion. She began on 6 September 2013 in Washington, D.C. and concluded in Orlando, Florida on 24 May 2014. Opening acts include Fifth Harmony, Zara Larsson, and Jackson Guthy During the tour Lloyd performed new songs except "Killin' It" and "Alone with Me".

Spotify and YouTube
Before the album release, five songs were released on Spotify and YouTube. It started out with "Sirens", and the song picture featured a piece of the album artwork. This continued with "Dirty Love", "Human", "Bind Your Love" and "M.F.P.O.T.Y." where each song revealed more of the artwork.

Singles
The album's lead single, "I Wish", featuring guest vocals from American rapper T.I. premiered on 31 August 2013 after being leaked two days earlier. It was officially released on 2 September 2013. The song received mostly positive reviews and reached the top 40 in Australia and peaked at 16 in New Zealand.  It failed to reach the top 100 in either the United Kingdom or the United States. "I Wish"'s music video, directed by Gil Green, was released onto Vevo on 24 September 2013.

The second single, "Sirens", premiered on 14 March 2014 on American radio station Sirius XM Hits 1 and was released 17 March 2014, along with the digital pre-order of Sorry I'm Late. The song has received critical acclaim from music critics. A music video for the song premiered on 29 April 2014.

Promotional singles
"Dirty Love" premiered on 28 March 2014 as the album's first promotional single. "Human" was released as the second promotional single on 11 April 2014. "Bind Your Love", the album's third promotional single, was released on 27 April 2014. "M.F.P.O.T.Y." was released as the fourth and final promotional single on 11 May 2014; it was, however, leaked online on 1 May 2014.

Critical reception

Upon its release, Sorry I'm Late received positive reviews from music critics, with praise being aimed at the maturity of the album's content and Lloyd's musical direction. Idolator awarded the album 3.5/5, stating "Sorry I’m Late may have really been worth the wait. While it’s still that fresh and carefree pop music that’s sure to be on every tween's playlist this summer, it does have elements that show Lloyd as a blossoming young woman". They further praised the album's lyrical content, saying "There are a number of tracks here that show Cher’s growth and maturity. The lyrics show that’s she’s not just about crushing on the boy next door and hanging with her girls", labeling Sirens, Sweet Despair and Goodnight as highlights of the album. AllMusic also praised the album, awarded it a 4/5. They said the album "finds the former British X-Factor contestant maturing just enough from her 2011 debut to show growth, while still retaining all of her bright, infectious pop sensibilities". They closed their review by stating "in the 21st century world of extreme pop divas and powerhouse productions action-packed with hooks, beats, and hashtagged lyrical content, Lloyd comes off as a natural, a likeable girl next door with a queen-sized attitude and voice to match".

ABC also praised the album, awarding it 3.5/5 and praising the tracks "Human", "Sweet Despair" and "Bind Your Love". They stated "Lloyd is an exploding charismatic firework of a performer and she carries this album to a new level. It is evident that she will get even better with each album she makes. Given her progress thus far, we now know she can achieve giant leaps", and closed their review by saying "This is a bit more than a guilty pleasure. Cher Lloyd has emerged for a victory lap". Jason Scott of Popdust awarded the album a 4/5, stating that it "could very well curve the mainstream in a refreshing new direction". He also heavily praised "Sirens", calling the track "one of the finest releases of the year, any genre" and closed his review by stating "Fans couldn’t ask for more on a project that sees one of the most promising rising stars shed her former bubblegum self and find a more mature, complex sound. Her (new) voice is loud and clear" and labelled "Sirens", "Human", "I Wish" and "Killin' It" as the best tracks. Time magazine also praised the album, saying that it "abandons what made her polarizing without losing what makes her interesting". They closed their review by stating "Though Lloyd has access to some of the top producers in pop, she hasn't delivered the kind of inescapable hit required for her to be added to the A list. (She comes very close on "Sirens" and the uplifting "Human.") But then again, she may not need to. With a very young fan base as devoted as hers is, she has a sizable core audience already in place".

Commercial performance
On 20 May 2014, Nielsen SoundScan released their Building Chart, which projected the album to debut at number nine on the Billboard 200. The album eventually debuted at number 12, on the charting week of 4 June 2014, with first-week sales of 17,000. As of December 2014, Sorry I'm Late has sold 41,000 copies in the US.

The album was released two months later in the United Kingdom and Ireland. The album peaked at number 58 on the Irish Albums Chart, while it debuted at number 21 on the UK Albums Chart. The following week, the album dropped out the UK Top 100.

As of January 2022, the album has generated over 145M views on YouTube, 146M streams on Spotify, and 42M on Pandora through Lloyd's official accounts.

Track listing

Notes
 signifies an additional vocal producer
 signifies a vocal producer
 signifies a remixer

Personnel
Credits for Sorry I'm Late adapted from AllMusic.

Cory Bice – assistant
Benny Blanco – instrumentation, producer, programming
Dan Book – background vocals
Stephen Bradley – trumpet
Tofer Brown – electric guitar
Johan Carlsson – engineer, guitar, musician, producer, vocal engineer, vocal producer
Peter Carlsson – engineer, vocal producer
Tom Coyne – mastering
Jason Evigan – engineer, producer, background vocals
Eric Eylands – assistant
Carl Falk – engineer, guitar, musician, producer, programming, vocal arrangement, vocal editing
Nikki Flores – background vocals
Kristoffer Fogelmark – vocal editing
Livvi Frank – background vocals
Serban Ghenea – mixing
Larry Goetz – acoustic guitar
GoMillion – photography
Oscar Görres – guitar, keyboards, producer
Catt Gravitt – vocal producer
John Hanes – mixing engineer
Jeri Heiden – art direction, design
Oscar Holter – keyboards, producer, programming
Michael Ilbert – engineer
Corky James – guitar
JP Robinson – creative director
Rouble Kapoor – engineer
Savan Kotecha – executive producer, vocal producer
Spyke Lee – assistant
Dennis Leupold – photography
Cher Lloyd – primary artist
LP – ukulele
Andrew Luftman – production coordination
Mag – engineer, producer, programming, synthesizer, vocal producer
Max Martin – background vocals
Robert Marvin – engineer, musician, producer
Gabriel McNair – trombone
Albin Nedler – vocal editing
Noah Passovoy – engineer
Rami – bass, engineer, musician, producer, programming, vocal arrangement, vocal editing
Tim Roberts – mixing assistant
Chris Sclafani – engineer
Kyle Shearer – programming
Paul Shearer – acoustic guitar
Shellback – bass, engineer, executive producer, guitar, instrumentation, keyboards, musician, producer, programming, vocals, background vocals
Matt Squire – engineer, musician, producer
Nick Steinhardt – art direction, design
Marlene Strand – background vocals
The Struts – keyboards, producer, programming, background vocals
T.I. – featured artist
Isaiah Tejada – programming
Emily Wright – engineer, vocal producer
Scott "Yarmov" Yarmovsky – production coordination

Charts

Release history

References

2014 albums
Cher Lloyd albums
Epic Records albums
Albums produced by Ilya Salmanzadeh
Albums produced by Shellback (record producer)
Albums produced by Johan Carlsson